P. pedunculata may refer to:

Petrophile pedunculata, conesticks, a flowering plant species
Pultenaea pedunculata, the matted bush-pea, a flowering plant species